Sergei Kozulin (born 9 September 1980) is a retired Kazakhstani International footballer who played as a defender.

References

External links

1981 births
Living people
Kazakhstani footballers
Association football defenders
Kazakhstan international footballers
FC Zhenis Astana players